The Nudelman-Suranov NS-37 was a  aircraft cannon, which replaced the unreliable Shpitalny Sh-37 gun. Large caliber was planned to allow destruction of both ground targets (including armoured ones) and planes (ability to shoot down a bomber with a single hit).

Developed by A. E. Nudelman and A. Suranov from OKB-16 Construction Bureau from 1941, it was tested at the front in 1943 and subsequently ordered into production, which lasted until 1945. It was used on the LaGG-3 and Yak-9T fighter planes (mounted between the vee of the engine, in motornaya pushka mounts) and Il-2 ground attack planes (in underwing pods).

Although the heavy round offered large firepower, the relatively low rate of fire and heavy recoil made hitting targets difficult. While pilots were trained to fire short bursts, on light aircraft only the first shot was truly aimed. Additionally, penetration of medium and heavy tanks' top armour was possible only at high angles (above 40 degrees), which was hard to achieve in battle conditions. For these reasons it was soon replaced in 1946 by the N-37 autocannon, which used a lighter 37×155 mm round.

See also
 Nudelman-Suranov NS-45 : larger Soviet version
 Nudelman N-37 : postwar Soviet version

Weapons of comparable role, performance and era
 Vickers S : 40-mm British equivalent
 M4 cannon : US equivalent
 BK 37 : German equivalent
 Ho-203 cannon : Japanese equivalent

References

External links

 NS-37 on RAM
 Schematic (in Russian)

External links
 history and description
 round data



37 mm artillery
Autocannons of the Soviet Union
Aircraft guns of the Soviet Union
Izhevsk machine-building plant products
Weapons and ammunition introduced in 1942